Arthur Owen Jones (16 August 1872 – 21 December 1914) was an English cricketer, noted as an all-rounder, and former Captain of England.  He was also a rugby union player for Leicester at full back or three quarter.

Early life

Jones was born in 1872 in Shelton, Nottinghamshire, and educated at Bedford Modern School and Jesus College, Cambridge.

Cricket career

Jones played for Cambridge University, Nottinghamshire, London County and England. He was named Wisden Cricketer of the Year in 1900.

Jones was the first substitute to keep wicket in a Test match, when he did so against Australia at The Oval in 1905.  He was a brilliant, sometimes impetuous, opening batsman and a leg-break and googly bowler. In 1903 he made what was then the highest-ever score by a Nottinghamshire batsman, scoring an unbeaten 296 against Gloucestershire at Trent Bridge, Nottingham. Jones played 12 Test matches for England, but lost the two games he captained. He led Nottinghamshire to the County Championship in 1907 and was captain of the 1907/08 England tour to Australia. But he only appeared in two matches because of illness. He remained captain of Nottinghamshire until a few months before his death from tuberculosis, in Dunstable, Bedfordshire.

Rugby career

Jones made 15 appearances for Bedford between 1889 and 1895 before moving to Leicester Tigers in 1895.  He was appointed captain between 1896–99 and then again between 1902 and 1904.  He was club captain when Tigers secured their first piece silverware, the Midlands Counties Cup, though missed the final through injury.  He was captain in the victorious finals of 1899, 1903 and 1904 and played in the victorious final of 1900 and 1901.  He became the first player to pass 500 points for the club against Moseley in 1903.

Between 1906 and 1912 he refereed 5 rugby internationals, including France's first test victory against Scotland in 1911.

References

External reference

England Test cricketers
England Test cricket captains
English cricketers
People educated at Bedford Modern School
English cricketers of 1890 to 1918
Nottinghamshire cricketers
Nottinghamshire cricket captains
Cambridge University cricketers
London County cricketers
Marylebone Cricket Club cricketers
North v South cricketers
Gentlemen cricketers
Midland Counties cricketers
Wisden Cricketers of the Year
Jones, Arthur Owen
1872 births
1914 deaths
People from Dunstable
People from Rushcliffe (district)
Cricketers from Nottinghamshire
Tuberculosis deaths in England
Alumni of Jesus College, Cambridge
Leicester Tigers players
C. I. Thornton's XI cricketers
Marylebone Cricket Club Australian Touring Team cricketers